Intelligence and personality have traditionally been studied as separate entities in psychology, but more recent work has increasingly challenged this view. An increasing number of studies have recently explored the relationship between intelligence and personality, in particular the Big Five personality traits.

General relationship
Intelligence and personality have some common features; for example, they both follow a relatively stable pattern throughout the whole of one’s life, and are to some degree genetically determined. In addition, they are both significant predictors of various outcomes, such as educational achievement, occupational performance, and health. The traditional view in psychology, which was that personality and intelligence should be studied as strictly separate entities, has come under scrutiny in light of modern personality research.

Historically, psychologists have drawn a hard distinction between intelligence and personality, arguing that intelligence is a cognitive trait while personality is non-cognitive. However, modern psychologists argue that intelligence and personality are intertwined, noting that personality traits tend to be related to specific cognitive patterns. For example, neuroticism is a personality trait that is related to rumination and compulsive thinking about possible threats. Similarly, agreeableness is a personality trait that is related to the consideration of others' mental states. The finding that IQ predicts work performance, academic achievement, and health might also point to a link between intelligence and personality, or else be grounds for further research into their relationship.

In considering the ties between intelligence and personality, it may be worth noting that they are typically not tested in the same way. Intelligence is assessed using ability tests (such as I.Q. tests), whereas personality is assessed using questionnaires. It has been suggested that intelligence should reflect an individual's maximal performance, while personality should reflect their typical behaviour.

By personality trait

Openness
Openness shows the strongest positive relationship with g (general intelligence) among the Big Five personality traits. The main meta-analytic estimates of correlations have ranged from .17 to .23.  Individuals with a high level of openness enjoy the experience of learning and prefer an intellectually stimulating environment. Meta-analytic research shows that openness is more strongly related to crystallized intelligence (r = .25) than with fluid intelligence (r = .17).  

Some psychologists have recently pointed out that previous instruments used to measure openness actually assessed two distinctive aspects. The first is intellect, which reflects intellectual engagement and perceived intelligence and is marked by ideas, while the second is emotion, which reflects the artistic and contemplative qualities related to being engaged in sensation and perception and is marked by fantasy, aesthetics, feelings and actions. Intelligence is more strongly related to intellectual engagement than with interest in aesthetics and fantasy. On this basis, intellect was found to be associated with the neural system of the working memory, which is related to g, whereas openness was not. In addition, according to a study of genetic behaviour, intellect is genetically closer to intelligence than openness.

Neuroticism 
Neuroticism has a meaningful negative correlation with intelligence. The main large meta-analyses have obtained correlations around r = -.09. Debate exists about the extent to which the correlation reflects a substantive relationship or issues with measurement. Researchers have noted that neuroticism is correlated with test anxiety, which refers to the psychological distress experienced by individuals prior to, or during, an evaluative situation. As such, some researchers have argued that neuroticism leads to test anxiety and under performance on cognitive tests. However, others researchers have argued that test anxiety is mostly incidental and caused by neuroticism, contextual pressures, and lower cognitive ability.

According to the results of a longitudinal study conducted by Gow et al., (2005), neuroticism influences an age-related decline in intelligence and there is a small negative correlation between neuroticism and a change in the level of IQ (r=-.18). Although it is still debatable if neuroticism reduces general intelligence, this study provided some valuable evidence and a direction for research. 
In addition, some interaction between intelligence and neuroticism has been found. Individuals with a high level of neuroticism demonstrated a poor performance, health, and adjustment only if they had a low level of intelligence. Therefore, intelligence may act as a buffer and compensate neuroticism in individuals.

Conscientiousness
The association between conscientiousness and intelligence is complex and uncertain. Some researchers theorize that people with lower levels of intelligence compensate for their lower level of cognitive ability by being more structured and effortful. While some studies have obtained a negatively correlated, others have not. In particular, a meta-analysis of 214 studies (n = 120,885) obtained a correlation of r = -.02. A meta-analysis of facet-level correlations suggested that preference for order and self-discipline may have a small negative correlation whereas conscientiousness facets related to competence have a small positive correlation with intelligence.

Furthermore, some interaction has been found between conscientiousness and intelligence. Conscientiousness has been found to be a stronger predictor of safety behaviour in individuals with a low level of intelligence than in those with a high level. This interaction may also be found in educational and occupational settings in future studies. Therefore, relatively speaking, an increase in either conscientiousness or intelligence may compensate for a deficiency in the other.

Extraversion
Most meta-analyses have found no correlation between overall extraversion and intelligence. There is some meta-analytic evidence to suggest that aspects of extraversion related to assertiveness may be slightly positively related to intelligence whereas aspects related to sociability may be slightly negatively related to intelligence. 

There are some moderating variables in the relationship between extraversion and g including differences in the assessment instruments and samples’ age and sensory stimulation; for example, no meaningful correlation was found between extraversion and intelligence in the samples of children. Furthermore, Bates and Rock (2004) used Raven’s matrices  and found that extraverts performed better than introverts with increasing auditory stimulation, whereas introverts performed best in silence. This result is consistent with that of Revelle et al. (1976).

Agreeableness
Meta-analytic research suggests that agreeableness and intelligence are uncorrelated. However, some components of agreeableness have been found to be related to intelligence. For example, aggression is negatively associated with intelligence (r is around -.20)  because unintelligent people may experience more frustration, which may lead to aggression and aggression and intelligence may share some biological factors. In addition, emotional perception and emotional facilitation, which are also components of agreeableness, have been found to be significantly correlated with intelligence. This may be because emotional perception and emotional facilitation are components of emotional intelligence and some researchers have found that emotional intelligence is a Second-Stratum Factor of g. Similarly, meta-analysis suggests that the related trait of honesty-humility is also uncorrelated with intelligence.

References

Intelligence
Personality